Baghelah-ye Sofla (also Romanized as Bāghelah-ye Soflá and Bāghalah-ye Soflá; also known as Bāqālā) is a village in Darb-e Gonbad Rural District, Darb-e Gonbad District, Kuhdasht County, Lorestan Province, Iran. At the 2006 census, its population was 220, in 44 families.

References 

Towns and villages in Kuhdasht County